William Edgar Richard Somerville (born 9 August 1984) is a New Zealand cricketer who plays for Auckland. He made his international debut for New Zealand in December 2018.

Early and domestic career
Somerville was born in the Wellington suburb of Wadestown. His family moved from New Zealand to Sydney, Australia, when he was nine and he grew up there. He attended Cranbrook School in Sydney's eastern suburbs. He returned to New Zealand to study at the University of Otago. A right-handed batsman and off-spin bowler, he played three matches for Otago, against Wellington in March 2005 and against Canterbury and Northern Districts in March 2006. He also appeared in several matches for the New Zealand Academy in the 2005–06 season.

After his studies he returned to Sydney to work as a chartered accountant and play cricket for University. He began playing for New South Wales in 2013–14. On 2 January 2016, he made his Twenty20 debut for the Sydney Sixers in the 2015–16 Big Bash League.

Bowling for New South Wales in the Sheffield Shield in November 2016, Somerville took 4 for 61 and 5 for 65 in a three-wicket victory over Western Australia and was named player of the match. He was one of the leading bowlers in the Sheffield Shield that season, with 35 wickets at an average of 23.14, including figures of 8 for 136 in the first innings against Queensland. He made his List A debut for New South Wales in the 2017–18 JLT One-Day Cup on 15 October 2017.

In June 2018, he was awarded a contract with Auckland for the 2018–19 season. In September 2018, he was named in the Auckland Aces' squad for the 2018 Abu Dhabi T20 Trophy.

In June 2020, he was offered a contract by Auckland ahead of the 2020–21 domestic cricket season.

International career
In November 2018, Somerville was added to New Zealand's Test squad for their series against Pakistan. He made his Test debut for New Zealand against Pakistan on 3 December 2018, and took 4-75 and 3–52 in New Zealand's 123-run victory.

See also
 List of New South Wales representative cricketers
 List of Otago representative cricketers

References

External links

  from the Australian Cricketers' Association

1984 births
Living people
New Zealand Test cricketers
New Zealand cricketers
Cricketers from Wellington City
People educated at Cranbrook School, Sydney
University of Otago alumni
Otago cricketers
New South Wales cricketers
Auckland cricketers
Australian accountants
Sydney Sixers cricketers